Helen Stewart Hunt (born 1938) is a Canadian former swimmer from Vancouver. At the 1954 British Empire and Commonwealth Games, Stewart (as she was then known) won a silver medal in the 4×110 yd freestyle relay. The next year, at the 1955 Pan American Games, she won a gold medal and two silver medals. She competed in two events at the 1956 Summer Olympics. After her swimming career, she was a member of the Canadian women's volleyball team at the 1967 Pan American Games (finished sixth) and the 1971 Pan American Games (placed fifth). She is the sister of Mary Stewart. Stewart is married to Ted Hunt, a professional football player (for the BC Lions) and member of the Canadian Olympic ski-jumping team, as well as a rugby and lacrosse player. Olympic snowboarder and politician Alexa Loo is her niece.

References

External links
 

1938 births
Living people
Canadian women's volleyball players
Canadian female swimmers
Olympic swimmers of Canada
Swimmers at the 1956 Summer Olympics
Swimmers from Vancouver
Swimmers at the 1954 British Empire and Commonwealth Games
Commonwealth Games silver medallists for Canada
Commonwealth Games medallists in swimming
Swimmers at the 1955 Pan American Games
Swimmers at the 1959 Pan American Games
Pan American Games gold medalists for Canada
Pan American Games silver medalists for Canada
Pan American Games medalists in swimming
Volleyball players at the 1967 Pan American Games
Volleyball players at the 1971 Pan American Games
Medalists at the 1955 Pan American Games
20th-century Canadian women
21st-century Canadian women
Medallists at the 1954 British Empire and Commonwealth Games